Victor Fritz-Crone (born 31 January 1992), also known as Victor Crone,  is a Swedish singer, guitarist and songwriter. He represented Estonia in the Eurovision Song Contest 2019 in Tel Aviv with the song "Storm".

Biography
Victor Crone was born and raised in Österåker, Sweden. He started playing guitar and writing songs at the age of 15. When he was 18 he moved to Los Angeles and Nashville to write songs with acclaimed artists such as Diane Warren, Desmond Child and Eric Bazilian. He performed in some international music conference centers of Los Angeles and he also released a song "Jimmy Dean" under his name Vic Heart.

In 2015, Victor released his debut single "Burning Man". He participated in Melodifestivalen 2015, featuring in the Behrang Miri song "Det rår vi inte för", which failed to qualify from the Andra Chansen round, losing to Samir & Viktor. 
On 16 February 2019, Victor Crone won the Estonian national selection Eesti Laul with the song "Storm" and he received the right to represent Estonia in the Eurovision Song Contest 2019, held in Tel Aviv, Israel. On 15 May, he qualified to the final. In the final Victor Crone placed 20th.

In November 2019, it was revealed that Crone joined the 2020 lineup for Melodifestivalen 2020. With his song, "Troubled Waters", he qualified to the finale from the fourth semifinal. He finished in ninth place, scoring a total of 57 points.

In November 2022, Crone was revealed to compete in Melodifestivalen 2023 with the song, "Diamonds". During the second round of the first heat, Crone placed second with 80 points and advanced to the second chance semi final, where he placed sixth overall with 28 points and was eliminated.

Discography

Studio albums

Singles

References
Notes

Sources

External links

1992 births
Living people
People from Österåker Municipality
Eurovision Song Contest entrants of 2019
Eurovision Song Contest entrants for Estonia
Swedish expatriates in the United States
Swedish male singers
Eesti Laul winners
Swedish pop singers
Melodifestivalen contestants of 2023
Melodifestivalen contestants of 2020
Melodifestivalen contestants of 2015